Jebus may refer to:

 Jebus, the mispronunciation of 'Jesus' from the 2000 Simpsons episode "Missionary: Impossible"
 Jebus, the nickname for Jebediah Christoff in Madness Combat
 Jebus, the pointed bow leader of the Tom Pudding tub boats
 Jebusite, a Canaanite tribe that inhabited Jerusalem prior to the conquest initiated by Joshua
 Jerusalem (historically Jebus), a city in the Middle East